Kennedy's Confection, is a monthly magazine published by Kennedy's Publications that covers confectionery industry. It is considered as industry's bible.

It has annual turn over of £500,000 a year.

History
Confectionery News magazine was started in 1890. Kennedy's Confection was launched in 1990 and it is published on a monthly basis.

Angus Kennedy edited Kennedy's Confection magazine for 10 years. The magazine has been in his family for 40 years and Kennedy had been involved with it since the age of 10, after his father died from cancer and his mother had to take over the business. As a child he had his own column, called "Sweet Spot".

Editors
 John Kennedy
 Angus Kennedy

References

Business magazines published in the United Kingdom
Monthly magazines published in the United Kingdom
Magazines established in 1890
Professional and trade magazines